Neoplea is a genus of pygmy backswimmers in the family Pleidae. There are at least three described species in Neoplea.

Species
These three species belong to the genus Neoplea:
 Neoplea apopkana (Drake & Chapman, 1953)
 Neoplea notana (Drake & Chapman, 1953)
 Neoplea striola (Fieber, 1844)

References

Further reading

 

Pleidae
Nepomorpha genera
Articles created by Qbugbot